Heavy Metal is a 1988 video game published by Access Software.

Gameplay
Heavy Metal is a game in which an arcade action war game combines elements of simulation and strategy.

Reception
Ronald F. Williams reviewed the game for Computer Gaming World and stated that "Heavy Metal has the high level graphics, sound and action that delight arcade enthusiasts of all ages, and offers a challenge to the budding strategist. It should be therapeutic excitement for gamers needing a momentary break from more cerebral games and be of special interest to those who collect games of artistic craftsmanship."

Reviews
Info - Jan, 1989
Amiga Format - Jul, 1990
ASM (Aktueller Software Markt) - Jul, 1990
ASM (Aktueller Software Markt) - May, 1990
Computer Gaming World - Jun, 1991
Amiga Power - May, 1991

References

External links

Review in Compute!
Review in Compute!'s Gazette
Review in Sinclair User
Review in Your Sinclair

1988 video games
Amiga games
Amstrad CPC games
Atari ST games
Commodore 64 games
DOS games
Shooter video games
Tank simulation video games
Top-down video games
Video games developed in the United States
ZX Spectrum games